Phyllacanthus imperialis, also known as the Sputnik urchin, imperial lance urchin, imperial sea urchin, imperial urchin, pencil sea urchin, lance urchin, knobby sputnik sea urchin, mine urchin, and land mine sea urchin, is a species of sea urchins in the family Cidaridae.

It has distinctive thick, blunt spikes. The test is brown or black. The spikes vary in color. This species emerges at night to eat invertebrates and sponges. During the day, it tends to remain hidden in holes in the coral reef. Phyllacanthus imperialis is found throughout the Indo-Pacific region.

References

Cidaridae
Animals described in 1816